Shivpur Assembly constituency is one of the 403 constituencies of the Uttar Pradesh Legislative Assembly, India. It is a part of the Varanasi district and one of the five assembly constituencies in the Chandauli Lok Sabha constituency. First election in this assembly constituency was held in 2012 after constituency came into existence when "Delimitation of Parliamentary and Assembly Constituencies Order, 2008" was passed in the year 2008.

Wards and areas
Extent of Shivpur Assembly constituency is KCs Shivpur, Jallhupur, Lohta (CT), Phulwaria (CT), Shivdaspur (CT) & Maruadih Rly. Settlement (ITS) of Varanasi tehsil.

Members of the Legislative Assembly

Election results

2022

2017

See also

Chandauli Lok Sabha constituency
Government of Uttar Pradesh
List of Vidhan Sabha constituencies of Uttar Pradesh
Sixteenth Legislative Assembly of Uttar Pradesh
Uttar Pradesh Legislative Assembly
Uttar Pradesh
Varanasi district

References

External links
 

Assembly constituencies of Uttar Pradesh
Politics of Varanasi district
Constituencies established in 2008
2008 establishments in Uttar Pradesh